Ephrin type-A receptor 8 is a protein that in humans is encoded by the EPHA8 gene.

Function 

This gene encodes a member of the ephrin receptor subfamily of the protein-tyrosine kinase family. EPH and EPH-related receptors have been implicated in mediating developmental events, particularly in the nervous system. Receptors in the EPH subfamily typically have a single kinase domain and an extracellular region containing a Cys-rich domain and 2 fibronectin type III repeats. The ephrin receptors are divided into 2 groups based on the similarity of their extracellular domain sequences and their affinities for binding ephrin-A and ephrin-B ligands. The protein encoded by this gene functions as a receptor for ephrin A2, A3 and A5 and plays a role in short-range contact-mediated axonal guidance during development of the mammalian nervous system.

Interactions 

EPHA8 has been shown to interact with FYN.

References

Further reading 

 
 
 
 
 
 
 
 
 
 
 
 
 
 
 

Tyrosine kinase receptors